Saba Hasan is an Indian contemporary artist who is based in Goa and New Delhi.

She has a BA (Honours) in Economics from Delhi University, New Delhi and a Masters in Cultural Anthropology from Syracuse University New York. She has also trained in art at the Ceruleum - Ecole d’arts Visuels, Lausanne and art history at the University of Cambridge, UK.

Her work includes painting, photography, book installations, voice works and film. Her works are with collectors in India, UK, Switzerland, Sri Lanka, Japan, Holland, USA, Spain and France.

Shows and exhibitions 
An active artist since 1996, Hasan has participated in several art shows, exhibitions, biennale's, photo exhibitions and film festivals. Some of these include:

Awards and recognition 

Some of Hasan's awards and accolades include:

 2022: Pollock-Krasner Foundation Grant, New York, USA  
 2014: MIFA: Moscow International Foto Awards, Moscow, Russia 
2014: Celeste Contemporary Art Prize Nomination, Milan, Italy 
2008: RPG Art Residency, Madh Island, India
 2007: Award for Painting, Raza Foundation, India
 2006: Residency in Paris, Government of France
 2002: Residency, George Keyt Foundation, Colombo, Sri Lanka
 1998: Ceruleum : Ecole D’Arts Visuels - Academie, Lausanne, Switzerland 
 1986: Fellowship in Culture Studies, Syracuse University, New York, USA

Bibliography 

 Saba Hasan : undeciphered fates, Barefoot publishers, New York
 The Indian Art Collectors Handbook by Dr Alka Pande, India
 Ten Creative Forces by Keshav Malik, Ravi Kumar Publishers,Paris
 International Contemporary Artists by Olga Antoniadou,
 Islamic Art, Past and Modern by Nuzhat Kazmi, Roli Books
 Samvaya published by the Raza Foundation, India
 Hidden Art Treasures, International Art, United Kingdom

References

1962 births
Living people
20th-century Indian women artists
21st-century Indian women artists
Painters from Delhi
Women artists from Delhi
20th-century Indian painters
Indian women painters
People from New Delhi
Indian contemporary painters
Indian women contemporary artists
Indian contemporary artists